Gorman Park (or Amelia Gorman Park) is a  park in Washington Heights, Manhattan, New York City. It is bounded by Broadway on the west and Wadsworth Terrace on the east and stretches from 188th to 190th Streets. The land rises more than a hundred feet in a steep incline from Broadway to Wadsworth Terrace. The park features a path that winds upward among trees. However, the park and stairs have been closed since 2020, with the exception of the upper plaza, due to the city's delay in beginning a reconstruction project.

The park is dedicated to a mother and daughter, Gertie Amelia Gorman and Gertie Emily Gorman. Gertie Emily Gorman and Charles Webb (a real estate investor and Yale graduate) had been married for less than a year when she died on September 25, 1923. Many of Gorman's relatives and friends suspected that Webb had poisoned his wife, though a toxicology investigation did not find evidence of such poisoning. For five years Gorman's will was disputed. A will dated August 21, 1923, left her entire estate to her husband and superseded a will that would have divided the proceeds among her relatives. 

Webb donated two acres of land to the city in 1929 in honor of both his wife and her mother. A stone wall features an inscription dedicating the park to "Gertie A. Gorman," as his wife had wished.
In 2011 the park became the focus of a local zoning and land use dispute when Quadriad Realty Partners proposed to build new residential towers taller than the by-right zoning rules permit on a vacant lot adjacent to the park in exchange for adding land to the park and thoroughly renovating it.

The park has been closed except the upper plaza since 2020. A capital reconstruction project has been on hold for two years, which the New York City Department of Parks and Recreation attributes to COVID-19 delays (as of November, 2022). The project design begin in November 2019, and was completed a year later than projected, in June 2022. Funding of $2,163,000 was procured by October 2021. The projected start date for construction is March 2023.

References

Parks in Manhattan
Washington Heights, Manhattan